Glycyrrhiza yunnanensis, is a plant species in the pea family, Fabaceae, native to China.

References 

yunnanensis
Flora of Asia